Pitkin is a census-designated place (CDP) in Vernon Parish, Louisiana, United States.

As of the 2010 census, the CDP's population was 576. James Ridgeway of Mother Jones said that the Pitkin area had 1,965 residents.

Burl Cain, the warden of LSP, was reared in Pitkin. His older brother, James David, a former member of both houses of the Louisiana State Legislature, was born in Pitkin in 1938.

History
In 1863, during the Civil War, Confederate soldiers built a military road from Niblett's Bluff to Alexandria that passed through the area. The Vernon Parish Tourism Commission placed an historical marker in 2009.

Demographics

According to the 2010 census, of its 576 population who live in 230 households, their median age was 41.6, 541 are White, 10 are multiracial, 3 are Asian, 2 are some other race, 1 is African American; 10 have Latino ethnicity.

Education
The Vernon Parish School District serves Pitkin. It operates Pitkin High School (PK-12). The Vernon Parish Library operates the Pitkin Branch Library.

References

Census-designated places in Louisiana
Census-designated places in Vernon Parish, Louisiana